Sinking Ships was an American hardcore punk band from Seattle, Washington, formed in 2004. In 2005, the band released their debut EP, Meridian, on Run for Cover Records and later re issued on 6131 Records and contributed the track "Turn My Headphones Up" to the Generations compilation released on Revelation Records.

Later that year, Sinking Ships signed to Revelation Records and released their album, Disconnecting, in July 2006. During their existence, Sinking Ships toured with bands such as Comeback Kid, Down To Nothing, Shook Ones, Blacklisted, and Shipwreck. They also released an EP on Revelation entitled Ten, as well as the tour-only single "Safe". Sinking Ships also released a split album released in Japan on the Alliance Trax label with the Japanese bands As We Let Go and My Love. This was their final release.

In the spring and summer of 2008, Sinking Ships played Rainfest (May 8) and Sound And Fury (July 8) This was to be their final shows.

Members have gone on to play in Wait In Vain, Self Defense Family, Gone But Not Forgotten, Meltdown, and A Storm of Light.

In 2013, the band reunited for the Rainfest pre-show.

Discography
Demo (self-released/Excursion Records, 2004)
Meridian (Run for Cover Records/6131 Records, 2005)
Generations Compilation (Revelation Records, 2005)
Disconnecting (Revelation Records, 2006)
Ten (Revelation Records, 2007)
Safe (Sinking Ships Records, 2007)
Split [w/ My Love & As We Let Go] (Alliance Trax, 2008)
Sinking Ships (Sinking Ships Records, 2008)

References

External links
 Sinking Ships website
 Official Sinking Ships myspace
 Sinking Ships interview at REDEFINE Magazine, September 2006
 Sinking Ships record label

Musical groups from Washington (state)
Hardcore punk groups from Washington (state)
Melodic hardcore groups
Revelation Records artists
Run for Cover Records artists